Interstate 520 (I-520) is a  auxiliary Interstate Highway that encircles most of Augusta, Georgia, and North Augusta, South Carolina, as a three-quarter beltway around the western, southern, and eastern parts of the main part of the Augusta metropolitan area. It begins at I-20 and State Route 232 (SR 232) in the northern part of Augusta, Georgia, and ends at I-20 in the northern part of North Augusta, South Carolina. I-520 is also known as Bobby Jones Expressway and the Deputy James D. Paugh Memorial Highway in Georgia and Palmetto Parkway in South Carolina. On the Georgia side, the road also carries the internal designation State Route 415 (SR 415).

Route description

|-
|GA
|
|-
|SC
|
|-
|Total
|
|}

The entire length of I-520 is part of the National Highway System, a system of routes determined to be the most important for the nation's economy, mobility, and defense.

Georgia
I-520 begins at an interchange with I-20 (Carl Sanders Highway) and the internal designation of SR 402 in the northern part of Augusta. At this interchange, the roadway continues as SR 232, which takes on the Bobby Jones Expressway name. The Interstate travels to the south-southeast. After passing the Augusta Exchange shopping complex, east of Doctors Hospital, it has an interchange with Wheeler Road and Marks Church Road. After a slight western jog, I-520 continues to the south-southeast and meets Wrightsboro Road, which leads to Augusta Mall. About  later is an interchange with U.S. Route 78 (US 78)/US 278/SR 10 (Gordon Highway). The freeway curves to the southeast, passing by Glenn Hills Middle School and Glenn Hills High School, to an interchange with US 1/SR 4 (Deans Bridge Road) and SR 540 (Fall Line Freeway). It passes by a campus of Augusta Technical College and the Richmond County Technical Career Magnet School, before curving to the east-southeast and meeting an interchange with Windsor Spring Road also with US 25/SR 121 (Peach Orchard Road) and SR 555/SR 565 (Savannah River Parkway). After a curve to the east is an interchange with SR 56 (Mike Padgett Highway), which is east of Southside Elementary School and northeast of East-Central Regional Hospital. I-520 curves to the east-northeast and has an interchange with Doug Barnard Parkway (former State Route 56 Spur (SR 56 Spur)). The Interstate gradually curves to the northeast and has an interchange with Laney Walker Boulevard and SR 28 (Sand Bar Ferry Road). Just over  later, it crosses the Savannah River into South Carolina and the city limits of North Augusta.

South Carolina
I-520 curves to the north-northwest, to an interchange with US 1/US 78/US 278 (only signed as "US 1"). The highway curves back to the north-northeast and has an interchange with South Carolina Highway 126 (SC 126; Clearwater Road). During a slight westward shift is an interchange with US 25/SC 121 (Edgefield Road). Just north-northeast of there, I-520 meets its eastern terminus, another interchange with I-20.

Named portions
In Georgia, I-520 is known as Bobby Jones Expressway for golfer Bobby Jones. In South Carolina, it is known as Palmetto Parkway for the sabal palmetto, the state tree. Between exits 2 and 3, the highway is known as the Deputy James D. Paugh Memorial Highway after a Richmond County sheriff's deputy who was killed at exit 3 when responding to reports of a gunman who was shooting at passing cars. I-520 loses its state route designation in South Carolina, as that state does not co-number its Interstates with state highway numbers.

History
The highway that would become I-520 was under construction between May 1963 and January 1966 from its western terminus to just south of the US 1/SR 4 interchange in Augusta. Also, it was proposed to be an extension of SR 232, at least as far as US 25/SR 121. In 1966, the highway was open and signed as SR 232 from I-20 to Wrightsboro Road. It was under construction from US 1/SR 4 to Doug Barnard Parkway. In 1974, SR 232 was open from Wrightsboro Road to US 1/SR 4. In 1977, the highway was redesignated as I-520. The next year, it was open from US 1/SR 4 to Doug Barnard Parkway. In 1986, the highway was under construction from Doug Barnard Parkway to SR 28. In 1998, this segment was opened. The next year, it was proposed to be extended to the South Carolina state line. In 2004, this extension was opened. In 2010, the highway was extended to its current eastern terminus in the northern part of North Augusta.

In January 2015,  of I-520 were expanded to three lanes in each direction after work started in February 2012 for a cost of $33 million.

Exit list
In accordance with MUTCD guidelines for auxiliary Interstates, exit numbering is continuous across the state line and does not reset.

See also

References

External links

 
 
 Interstate Guide-Interstate 520
 Southeast Roads-Interstate 520

20-5
20-5
20-5
Transportation in Richmond County, Georgia
Interstate 20-5
Transportation in Aiken County, South Carolina
5